The Last Concert may refer to:

 The Complete Last Concert, an album by the Modern Jazz Quartet
 The Last Concert (Rosemary Clooney album), 2002
 Take All of Me, a 1976 film also known as The Last Concert
 ‘’ The Last Concert’’ an album by Selena